The following lists events that happened during 1861 in New Zealand.

A ceasefire is reached in the First Taranaki War, with British efforts to defeat Māori disaffected over land purchases having largely failed.

Prosperity comes to the south with the onset of the Central Otago Gold Rush. Within a year the population of the Tuapeka goldfields is twice that of Dunedin.

Incumbents

Regal and viceregal
Head of State — Queen Victoria
Governor — Colonel Thomas Gore Browne leaves office on 3 October to take up the post of Governor of Tasmania. His successor is Sir George Grey who takes up the position in December.

Government and law
The general election of 1860–61 concludes on 28 March having begun on 12 December the previous year. The 3rd Parliament commences.

Speaker of the House — David Monro becomes Speaker after the retirement of Sir Charles Clifford the previous year.
Premier — William Fox replaces Edward Stafford on 12 July after Stafford loses a vote of no-confidence.
Minister of Finance — William Richmond loses the post on 12 July with the fall of the Fox government, and is replaced by Reader Wood.
Chief Justice — Hon George Arney

Events 
 16 February: The Southern News and Foveaux Strait's Herald publishes its first issue. The paper will become daily by 1875 and change its name to The Southland Daily News. It continues until 1968.
 28 February: The Government-sponsored Māori language magazine, The Maori Messenger or Te Karere Maori publishes its final issue and is replaced by Te Manuhiri Tuarangi and Maori Intelligencer, which continues until 1863.
21 March: The Auckland Examiner, which started in 1856, ceases publication.
 25 May: The Press publishes its first issue. It begins as a weekly newspaper, will move to bi-weekly in 1862, and becomes daily in 1863. It continues .
 29 June: Confirmation of the richness of Gabriel Read's gold discovery at Gabriel's Gully on the Tuapeka River is published in Dunedin and the Central Otago Gold Rush is on.
 15 November: The Otago Daily Times produces its first issue. The newspaper continues .
 Otago Gold Rush (1861–63) 
Undated
 The Māori King Movement begins publication of Te Hokioi o Nui-Tireni e Rere atu ra, which continues until 1863.

Sport

Shooting
The first National Rifle Shooting Championships is held. This is the oldest national championships in New Zealand in any sport. The Championships are held in conjunction with various district contests until the first centralised Championships at Trentham in 1902.

The winner receives the Championship Belt (and Pouch). In 1907 the belt is won outright by A. Ballinger and it is renamed the Ballinger Belt. This name has been applied retroactively to the Championship since its inception.

Ballinger Belt: Lieutenant Brighton (Auckland)

Births
 21 February (in Italy): – G. P. Nerli, painter  
 12 June: James Gardiner, Australian politician.

Unknown date
 William Stewart, politician.

Deaths

 8 February: William Cutfield King, member of the New Zealand House of Representatives
 26 March: Andrew Sinclair, British surgeon notable for his botanical collections
 13 June: Te Herekiekie, tribal leader
 18 July (in London): Joseph Greenwood, soldier and member of the New Zealand House of Representatives
 16 September: Jeanie Collier, runholder
 17 November (in London): John Robert Godley, founder of Canterbury
 22 November (in Grafton, New South Wales): William Edward Vincent, printer and publisher

Unknown date
 Te Huruhuru, tribal leader

See also
List of years in New Zealand
Timeline of New Zealand history
History of New Zealand
Military history of New Zealand
Timeline of the New Zealand environment
Timeline of New Zealand's links with Antarctica

References
General
 Romanos, J. (2001) New Zealand Sporting Records and Lists. Auckland: Hodder Moa Beckett. 
Specific

 
1860s in New Zealand
Years of the 19th century in New Zealand
New Zealand
New Zealand